The World Championship of Public Speaking began in 1938 and has grown to over 50,000 participants in 149 countries in 2022. In its early decades, it was referred to as the Toastmasters Speech Contest.  By the 1990s, there were about 10,000 participants every year.  The contest's popularity grew rapidly in the 2000s.  The contest has been called the "largest speech contest in the world" by Daijiworld.

History 
1960 champion Glenn E. Carroll is the first non-American (from Canada) to win the title.
1977 champion Evelyn Jane Burgay is the first woman to win the title.
1982 champion Kenneth Bernard is the first from outside North America (Australia) to win the title.
1985 champion Marie C. Pyne is the first European (Ireland) to win the title.
1995 Champion Mark Brown is the first and only Jamaican to win the title.
2014 champion Dananjaya Hettiarachchi of Sri Lanka was the first Asian to win the championship. In 2008, Lashunda Rundles became the first African American woman to ever win the title of World Champion of Public Speaking. She also was the first woman to win in almost two decades. In 2018, Ramona J. Smith became the second African American woman to win, it had been a decade since a woman took the title. Also in 2018, for the first time ever in the history of Toastmasters International, three women became the top speakers in the world. Sherri Su of China took 2nd place. Anita Fain Taylor of Florida, USA took 3rd place, Ramona J. Smith took 1st place. In 2021 Verity Price (South Africa) became the 6th woman to ever win the international speech contest, and the first speaker in history to win from Africa.

See also 

 Public speaking

References

External links 

 Toastmasters International --Official website

Public speaking
Public speaking competitions
Toastmasters International